Menachem Mendel Yosef Zaks (1898–1974) (commonly known as Rabbi Mendel Zaks) was an Orthodox Jewish rabbi in Belarus and the United States, best known for being the Rosh Yeshiva of the Raduń Yeshiva and being the son-in-law to Yisrael Meir Kagan, the Chofetz Chaim.

Early life 

Zaks was born in Siluva. Before joining the yeshiva in Radun, he studied in the Yeshiva Knesses Beis Yitzchok (while it was still in Slabodka, before it moved to Kaminetz). He was forced to leave Radun during World War I and then studied under Reuven Dov Dessler. He also studied under Meir Simcha of Dvinsk whose Meshech Chochmah he had helped print.

After the war, Zaks returned to Radun where he studied with his future father-in-law. In 1922, he married Faiga Chaya, Kagan's youngest daughter (who was 64 at the time of her birth). By doing so, he joined Kagan as leader of the yeshiva and in all other communal affairs. Zaks was immediately recognized for his teaching and leadership abilities. His vast knowledge of Talmudic Law, coupled with a photographic memory and unending hours spent with his students attracted even more students to the Radin Yeshiva at that time.

In 1925, Zaks incorporated the Yeshiva in the United States in an effort to raise money there for the operation of the Yeshiva and its charities.

Teaching career 
Upon the death of Naftoli Trop in 1928, Zaks was appointed Rosh Yeshiva in the yeshiva in Radun, Poland. The outbreak of World War II forced the yeshiva to transfer to Vilna, and eventually Zaks re-established the yeshiva in 1943 at New York City. In 1941 he moved to New York. In 1946, he accepted the position of rosh yeshiva and bochen (examiner) at Yeshiva University's Rabbi Isaac Elchanan Theological Seminary. Legend has it that Zaks edited the final version of the Mishnah Berurah in his office (currently occupied by Dr. Seth Taylor) in the MTA building. Following his retirement, he died in Jerusalem in 1974.

Zaks had an extraordinary memory, a pure mind, and was an expert in the Talmud and its commentaries.

His sons Gershon Zaks and Hillel Zaks (rabbi in Kiryat Sefer and Rosh Yeshiva in Yeshivas Knesses Hagedolah) died in 1989 and 2015, respectively. His daughter, Rivka Wiesenfeld, died in 2008.

References

External links
Yeshivas Chofetz Chaim (Rabbi Zaks' Yeshiva)
A Picture of Reb Mendel

Lithuanian Orthodox rabbis
American Orthodox rabbis
Yeshiva University rosh yeshivas
1898 births
1974 deaths
People from Raseiniai District Municipality
20th-century Lithuanian rabbis